Pterolobium indicum may refer to:

 Pterolobium indicum A.Rich., a synonym of P. hexapetalum
 Pterolobium indicum A. Rich. var. microphyllum (Miq.) Baker, a synonym of P. microphyllum
 Pterlobium indicum "sensu auct., non A.Rich., Fer", a synonym of P. membranulaceum